Chegodayevsky is a rural locality (a settlement) in Zavrazhskoye Rural Settlement, Nikolsky District, Vologda Oblast, Russia. The population was 7 as of 2002.

Geography 
Chegodayevsky is located 39 km southeast of Nikolsk (the district's administrative centre) by road. Vysokinsky is the nearest rural locality.

References 

Rural localities in Nikolsky District, Vologda Oblast